Abu Dhabi University (ADU) is a private research university with its main campus in Khalifa City, Abu Dhabi, United Arab Emirates, and satellite campuses in Al Ain, Dubai and Madinat Zayed. Founded in 2003 by Ali Saeed bin Harmal al-Dhaheri, it's the largest private institution in the country that offers courses in various subjects up to post-graduation.

Overview 
The university's inception can be traced to the Charter of Abu Dhabi University in the year 2000 by Sheikh Hamdan bin Zayed al-Nayhan, the-then Deputy Prime Minister of the United Arab Emirates. Following three years of planning, the Abu Dhabi University was inaugurated in June 2003 and opened it's doors to students in September 2003. According to the university, its founders "envisioned an institution that would be among the best in the United Arab Emirates, the Arabian Gulf region, and the world".

Accreditation 
The College of Business Administration received AACSB accreditation in 2015 and EQUIS in 2017. Some College of Engineering programs received accreditation from ABET in 2015. In 2016 the university gained accreditation from the Western Association of Schools and Colleges (WASC) in the United States. The Bachelor of Architecture course at Abu Dhabi University (ADU) earned the Royal Institute of British Architects (RIBA) accreditation in 2018. Abu Dhabi University is a partner with CIMA who has been accredited through the CIMA Global Learning scheme.

ADU Smart Learning Center 
Abu Dhabi University launched the ‘ADU Smart Learning Center’ to upskill faculty, design courses.

Colleges and programs 
Abu Dhabi University provides both undergraduate and postgraduate programs, and consists of four colleges along with an English Language Institute. It currently has 8,000 students from 70 countries.

Campuses

Abu Dhabi Campus

Scheduled to open in August 2016, an expansion will also feature 12 classrooms, 110 faculty and staff offices, meeting rooms, and multi-purpose rooms.

Al Ain Campus

Opened in 2003 as one of the oldest campuses of the university. In 2017, a new campus in Al Ain was scheduled to open by September 2019 at a $81M cost. The new expansions will feature 70 classrooms and 137 offices, providing capacity for more than 2500 students.

Dubai Campus

Abu Dhabi University opened a new campus in Dubai located in Dubai Knowledge Park in September 2017. The 3,490-square-metre campus was inaugurated by Shaikh Nahyan Bin Mubarak Al Nahyan, Minister of Culture and Knowledge Development, who is also the vice-president of ADU's Board of Regents.

International ranking 

The QS World Universities ranked Abu Dhabi University one of the best 750 best universities in the world (and 6th in the United Arab Emirates) in 2018.

References 

Educational institutions established in 2003
Universities and colleges in the Emirate of Abu Dhabi
Education in Abu Dhabi
Buildings and structures in Abu Dhabi
2003 establishments in the United Arab Emirates